Ryan Risidore (born April 6, 1976) is a Canadian former professional ice hockey defenceman.

Risidore, played major junior hockey with the Guelph Storm of the Ontario Hockey League, then went on to play eight seasons in the minor leagues and one in Europe before retiring as a professional player following the 2004–05 season.

Career statistics

References

https://www.eliteprospects.com/player/87254/ryan-risidore

1976 births
Living people
Ayr Scottish Eagles players
Canadian ice hockey defencemen
Columbus Cottonmouths (ECHL) players
Guelph Storm players
Hamilton Bulldogs (AHL) players
Hartford Whalers draft picks
Hartford Wolf Pack players
Ice hockey people from Ontario
Indianapolis Ice players
Sportspeople from Hamilton, Ontario
Springfield Falcons players
Tallahassee Tiger Sharks players
Canadian expatriate ice hockey players in Scotland
Canadian expatriate ice hockey players in the United States